

Godwine was a medieval Bishop of Rochester. He was consecrated between 994 and 995. He died sometime around 1013.

Citations

References

External links
 

Bishops of Rochester
10th-century English bishops
11th-century English Roman Catholic bishops